In the run up to the 2020 Slovak parliamentary election, various organisations carry out opinion polling to gauge voting intention in Slovakia. Results of such polls are displayed in this article.

The date range for these opinion polls are from the previous parliamentary election, held on 5 Mar 2016, to the present day.

Party vote
Poll results are listed in the tables below in reverse chronological order, showing the most recent first, and using the date the survey's fieldwork was done, as opposed to the date of publication. If such date is unknown, the date of publication is given instead. The highest percentage figure in each polling survey is displayed in bold, and the background shaded in the leading party's colour. In the instance that there is a tie, then no figure is shaded. The lead column on the right shows the percentage–point difference between the two parties with the highest figures. When a specific poll does not show a data figure for a party, the party's cell corresponding to that poll is shown empty.

Voting intention estimates

Seat projections

Special pollings
This section shows polls from Median, which conducts polling more on potential gains and less on seat projections. This section will also include special polling conducted only on certain age groups, half–way polls, meaning that they are not comparable to official polling because it doesn't include all groups of population.

Notes

References

Opinion polling in Slovakia
Slovakia